There are two species of lizard named mallee worm-lizard:

 Aprasia aurita
 Aprasia inaurita